Hiram Abiff Boaz (1866–1962) was the president of Polytechnic College from 1902 to 1911, and of Southern Methodist University from 1920 to 1922. He then became an American bishop in the Methodist Episcopal Church, South.

Biography
Hiram Abiff Boaz was born in Murray, Kentucky, on December 18, 1866. He graduated from the Sam Houston Normal Institute in 1887, and Southwestern University, from which he received a B.S. in 1893 and an M.A. in 1894.  In 1894, he married Carrie Browne, daughter of a Methodist preacher. They met while both were attending Sam Houston Normal School; the couple later had three daughters. He was a member of the Kappa Alpha Order. He became a Methodist pastor and served in Fort Worth, Abilene, and Dublin. From 1902 to 1911, he served as the president of Polytechnic College. In 1911, he was the vice-president of Southern Methodist University for a brief period of time, and returned to Polytechnic College for five more years. From 1918 to 1920, he served as the secretary of the Methodist Board of Church Extension in Louisville, Kentucky. From 1920 to 1922, he served as the second president of Southern Methodist University. In 1922, he became a bishop in the Methodist Episcopal Church, South. He served in the Far East, Arkansas, Oklahoma, Texas, and New Mexico.  He retired in 1938, and became a trustee of Southern Methodist University and Southwestern University.  Boaz was a Freemason, and later affiliated his masonic membership to Hillcrest Lodge, which at that time was located on Hillcrest Avenue across the street from SMU.

Bibliography
Fundamentals of Success: Or, Making the Most of Life (1923)
The Essentials of an Effective Ministry (1937)
Eighty-four Golden Years (1951)

See also
 List of bishops of the United Methodist Church

References

1866 births
1962 deaths
Sam Houston State University alumni
Southwestern University alumni
American Methodist Episcopal, South bishops
Bishops of the Methodist Episcopal Church, South
American theologians
Presidents of Southern Methodist University
People from Dallas
20th-century Methodist bishops